is the second single from Japanese pop singer Miki Fujimoto and was released on June 12, 2002. It sold a total of 40,450 copies, peaking at number four on the Oricon charts.

Track listing
 
 
  (Instrumental)

External links
Sotto Kuchizukete Gyutto Dakishimete entry at Up-Front Works

Miki Fujimoto songs
2002 singles
Songs written by Tsunku